The 11th government of Turkey existed for the short term of 25 January 1939 to 3 April 1939. It is also known as the first Saydam cabinet.

Background 

The government was formed after Celal Bayar, the prime minister of the previous government, resigned. The new prime minister was Refik Saydam, the secretary general of the Republican People's Party.

The government

Aftermath
Refik Saydan's cabinet ended because of the general elections held on 26 March. However, the prime minister of the next government was also Refik Saydam.

References

Cabinets of Turkey
Republican People's Party (Turkey) politicians
1939 establishments in Turkey
1939 disestablishments in Turkey
Cabinets established in 1939
Cabinets disestablished in 1939
Members of the 11th government of Turkey
5th parliament of Turkey
Republican People's Party (Turkey)